Vladimir Vyshpolsky (28 December 1915 – 18 February 1987) was a Soviet fencer. He competed in the team sabre event at the 1952 Summer Olympics.

References

External links
 

1915 births
1987 deaths
Russian male fencers
Soviet male fencers
Olympic fencers of the Soviet Union
Fencers at the 1952 Summer Olympics